The siege of Mosul (1743) was the siege of the Ottoman-held city of Mosul in northern Mesopotamia by Nader Shah's army during the Persian invasion of the Ottoman Empire in 1743.

Commencement of the siege
The Persian siege train had been much improved and augmented since Nader's earlier campaigns as a Safavid general and included hundreds of heavy cannon and mortars. However, due to Nader's illness and impatience with the progression of the siege works, a premature assault was ordered with 40,000 Persian soldiers mounting the city walls using ladders. The city was heavily defended by her Wali Hussain Pasha al-Jalili. The attack was beaten back with heavy casualties. Nader sent a delegation into the city and the garrison commander received them warmly, agreeing to forward their terms to Istanbul and offering gifts to be taken back to the Shah. Istanbul sent a part of plenipotentiaries to negotiate a peace treaty predicated on Nader withdrawing to the border.

Conclusion
The Persian army lifted the siege of Mosul, although the siege of Basra in the south continued nonetheless. The peace treaty was negotiated and signed by both parties, however, the Ottoman Sultan would later renege on the terms of agreement, thereby sanctioning the resumption of hostilities which eventually led to the Battle of Kars (1745).

See also
Battle of Mosul (1745)
Battle of Kars (1745)

References

Mosul
1743 in the Ottoman Empire
1743 in Iran
History of Mosul
Mosul
Mosul